Arthur Hirsch (1866–1948) was a German mathematician.

Life and work 
Hirsch completed his schooling in Königsberg in 1882 and then studied mathematics and physics in the universities of Berlin and Königsberg. Among his teachers at Königsberg were David Hilbert and Adolf Hurwitz. In 1892 he received a doctorate from Königsberg for a thesis about linear differential equations.

The following year, he took his docent habilitation at Polytechnikum of Zurich, where he was, successively, assistant professor from 1893, titular professor from 1897 and ordinary professor from 1903 until his retirement in 1936.

The work of Hirsch is primarily on differential equations and hypergeometric functions. He published seven papers about it in Mathematische Annalen. Hirsch was a member of the Swiss Mathematical Society from his foundation in 1910.

References

Bibliography

External links 
 
 ,

19th-century German mathematicians
20th-century German mathematicians
1866 births
1948 deaths
Scientists from Königsberg
University of Königsberg alumni